Lafina  is a form of a Greek folk dance from Thessaly, Greece. It is very similar to syrtos.

See also
Music of Greece
Greek dances

References
 Λαφίνα

Greek dances